Mechanicsburg Commercial Historic District may refer to:

Mechanicsburg Commercial Historic District (Mechanicsburg, Ohio), listed on the National Register of Historic Places in Champaign County, Ohio
Mechanicsburg Commercial Historic District (Mechanicsburg, Pennsylvania), listed on the National Register of Historic Places in Cumberland County, Pennsylvania